San Salvatore is a Romanesque-style, Roman Catholic church  in Terni, region of Umbria, in Italy.

History
The present layout of the church at the site was set in the 12th century, but portions are possibly much older. Excavations have also uncovered the base of Roman structures below. The layout is unusual due to its circular presbytery. Chapels were added in the 16th and 17th centuries.

See also
 History of medieval Arabic and Western European domes

References

12th-century Roman Catholic church buildings in Italy
 Salvatore
Romanesque architecture in Terni